The 1990–91 UC Irvine Anteaters men's basketball team represented the University of California, Irvine during the 1990–91 NCAA Division I men's basketball season. The Anteaters were led by eleventh year head coach Bill Mulligan and played at the Bren Events Center. They were members of the Big West. They finished the season 11–19, 6–12 in Big West play. On 14 February 1991, Mulligan announced that he will resign as head coach at the end of the season.

Previous season 
The 1989–90 UC Irvine Anteaters men's basketball team finished the season with a record of 5–23, their worst in school history until that point, and 3–15 in Big West play.

Roster

Schedule

|-
!colspan=9 style=|Non-Conference Season

|-
!colspan=9 style=|Conference Season

|-

Source

References

UC Irvine Anteaters men's basketball seasons
UC Irvine
UC Irvine Anteaters
UC Irvine Anteaters